Geraldine McMillian is an American soprano who has had an active career in concerts and operas since the mid-1980s.

Career
After graduating from the Juilliard School, where she studied with Eleanor Steber, McMillian made her professional opera debut in 1986 at the Houston Grand Opera as Annie in George Gershwin's Porgy and Bess. She repeated the role for her debut with the San Francisco Opera the following year, and in 1988 portrayed Clara in that opera for her debut with the Florentine Opera in Milwaukee. In 1989 she sang a program of works by Richard Strauss with the Chicago Symphony Orchestra.

McMillian's first major success was her debut performance at the New York City Opera (NYCO) in 1990 as Mimi in Giacomo Puccini's La bohème. Later that year she performed the role of Bess with the NYCO and was heard as Liu in Puccini's Turandot with the Florida Grand Opera. In 1991 she toured to 56 North American cities with the NYCO, performing Countess Almaviva in Wolfgang Amadeus Mozart's The Marriage of Figaro. Music critic John Rockwell of The New York Times stated in his review that "[McMillian's] soprano, big and shining like a cross between Eleanor Steber and Martina Arroyo, commands attention.

In January 1992 she embarked on a second NYCO national tour in the title role in Puccini's Tosca, and in 1994 she was heard with the NYCO at their Lincoln Center home and on national tour in the title role of Puccini's Madama Butterfly. In 1998, she sang the title role in Giuseppe Verdi's Aida with the Boston Lyric Opera, the Minnesota Opera, and the Nashville Opera. She has since sung the Ethiopian Princess with Opera Colorado (2000) and Opera Omaha. In 2000 she sang the Monisha in Scott Joplin's Treemonisha at the Opera Theatre of Saint Louis, Madame Lidoine in Francis Poulenc's Dialogues of the Carmelites at the Central City Opera, and Donna Anna in Mozart's Don Giovanni at the Connecticut Opera. She returned to the Connecticut Opera to sing Liu in Turandot in 2002.

References

Living people
Year of birth missing (living people)
Juilliard School alumni
American operatic sopranos
21st-century American women